Cymbiola malayensis is a species of sea snail, a marine gastropod mollusk in the family Volutidae, the volutes.

Description

Distribution
This marine species occurs off Malaysia.

References

External links
 MNHN, Paris: holotype

Volutidae
Gastropods described in 2000